Morphan is a chemical compound.

It is the base of the benzomorphan family of drugs.

See also 
 Benzomorphan
 Azocine
 Morphinan

References 

Azocines